Territory of Colorado (California) was an 1859-60 attempt by Californios  and pro-slavery Southerners to separate the southern counties of California into a separate Territory of the United States.

Californios (dissatisfied with inequitable taxes and land laws) and pro-slavery Southerners in the lightly populated "Cow Counties" of Southern California attempted three times in the 1850s to achieve a separate statehood or territorial status separate from Northern California. The last attempt, the Pico Act of 1859, was passed by the California State Legislature, and signed by the State governor John B. Weller.  It was approved overwhelmingly by nearly 75% of voters  in the proposed Territory of Colorado. The act aimed to cut through and divide the counties of Tulare and San Bernardino which were much larger at the time, to create a new east–west boundary line at "six standard parallels [usually 144 miles] south of the Mount Diablo base-line," to include San Luis Obispo County and the rest of California south of the new line. The proposal was sent to Washington, D.C. with a strong advocate in Senator Milton Latham.  However the secession crisis following the election of Abraham Lincoln in 1860 led to the proposal never coming to a vote.

References

Further reading

  B.A. Cecil Stephens, "North and South: The Early Struggles for State Division," Los Angeles Herald, December 27, 1891, image 9

  "State Division Object of Many Past Movements," Weekly Sentinel, Santa Cruz, California, April 27, 1907, image 6

  "Committee to Gather Data on State Division," Los Angeles Herald, October 6, 1909, image 8

  Ruben Vives, "Scrutiny Over School Named for Confederate General," Los Angeles Times, July 6, 2015, image 3 

History of Colorado
19th century in California
Proposed states and territories of the United States